Chris Afarian (born June 5, 1972) is a former American soccer player who played for the San Jose Grizzlies in the Continental Indoor Soccer League and the California Jaguars in the A-League.

University
Afarian studied at the Santa Clara University, where he played both American football and soccer. He was named to the all-conference team in 1994.

Career statistics

Club

Notes

References

1972 births
Living people
Santa Clara University alumni
American soccer players
Association football midfielders
San Jose Grizzlies players
California Jaguars players
A-League (1995–2004) players